Selapadu is a village in Andhra Pradesh, India.  It is in Chebrolu revenue mandal.

References

Villages in Guntur district